The Karikari Peninsula on the east coast of the far north of Northland, New Zealand, is between Rangaunu Harbour to the west, and Doubtless Bay to the southeast. It is a right-angled land mass of two relatively distinct parts. The rocky northern part, which has an east–west orientation and is approximately 17 km long, was originally an island but is now connected to the mainland by a low sandy tombolo approximately 11 km long, which has a north–south orientation.  The spiritually significant Puwheke sits high above the north-facing beaches.

Demographics

Karikari Peninsula had a population of 1,251 at the 2018 New Zealand census, an increase of 87 people (7.5%) since the 2013 census, and an increase of 309 people (32.8%) since the 2006 census. There were 465 households, comprising 630 males and 624 females, giving a sex ratio of 1.01 males per female. The median age was 51.8 years (compared with 37.4 years nationally), with 225 people (18.0%) aged under 15 years, 123 (9.8%) aged 15 to 29, 579 (46.3%) aged 30 to 64, and 324 (25.9%) aged 65 or older.

Ethnicities were 69.5% European/Pākehā, 44.4% Māori, 5.8% Pacific peoples, 1.4% Asian, and 1.9% other ethnicities. People may identify with more than one ethnicity.

The percentage of people born overseas was 10.3, compared with 27.1% nationally.

Of those people who chose to answer the census's question about religious affiliation, 45.8% had no religion; 43.9% were Christian; 2.2% had Māori religious beliefs; Hinduism, Islam, and Buddhism each had 0.2% as adherents; and 1.6% had other religions.

Of those at least 15 years old, 96 (9.4%) people had a bachelor or higher degree, and 222 (21.6%) people had no formal qualifications. The median income was $22,400, compared with $31,800 nationally. 81 people (7.9%) earned over $70,000 compared to 17.2% nationally. The employment status of those at least 15 was that 399 (38.9%) people were employed full-time, 165 (16.1%) were part-time, and 63 (6.1%) were unemployed.

History and culture

The local iwi are Ngāti Kahu. In Māori mythology, the waka Waipapa, captained by Kaiwhetu and Wairere, made its first landing in New Zealand at Karikari.

The two largest settlements are Whatuwhiwhi, which is situated the south side of the north-eastern part of the peninsula, and nearby Tokerau Beach, which lies at the northern end of the eastern side of the sandy strip. Maitai Bay (formerly called Matai Bay) on the northeast coast and Rangiputa on the west coast are popular tourist destinations.

The tombolo once had kauri forests, but in the 1960s the only vegetation was short scrub, some gorse and wīwī (rushes). Grapes are grown on the northern side of Karikari.

Marae

The Karikari Peninsula has two marae affiliated with Ngāti Kahu hapū. Haiti-tai-marangai Marae and meeting house are affiliated with Te Rorohuri / Te Whānau Moana. Werowero Marae is affiliated with Ngāti Tara ki Werowero.

Notes

Far North District
Populated places in the Northland Region
Tombolos
Peninsulas of the Northland Region